Abbas Helmy I of Egypt (also known as Abbas Pasha,  1 July 181213 July 1854) was the Wāli of Egypt and Sudan. He was a son of Tusun Pasha, the younger son of Muhammad Ali Pasha whom he succeeded as ruler of Egypt and Sudan. The Chambers Biographical Dictionary says of him: "[b]igoted and sensual, he did much to undo the progress made under Muhammad Ali."

Early years
Abbas was born on 1 July 1812 in Jeddah and was brought up in Cairo. Being the grandson of Muhammad Ali, he succeeded his uncle Ibrahim Pasha in ruling Egypt and Sudan in 1848.

As a young man, he fought in the Levant under his uncle Ibrahim Pasha in the Syrian War. Muhammad Ali Pasha was removed from office on 1 September 1848, on account of mental weakness. He was replaced by his son Ibrahim Pasha, who reigned briefly as Regent of Egypt and Sudan from 1 September 1848 until his death on 10 November 1848. The death of Ibrahim made Abbas I, in turn, Regent of Egypt and Sudan from 10 November 1848 until 2 August 1849 (the date of Muhammad Ali Pasha's death), at which time Abbas became the reigning Wāli of Egypt and Sudan until 13 July 1854.

Ruler of Egypt
Abbas has been often described as a mere voluptuary, but Nubar Pasha spoke of him as a true gentleman of the "old school". He was seen as reactionary, morose and taciturn, and spent nearly all his time in his palace. He undid, as far as lay in his power, the works of his grandfather, both good and bad. Among other things, he abolished trade monopolies, closed factories and schools, and reduced the strength of the region's army to 9,000 men. He also shut down construction of the Delta Dam and opposed the construction of the Suez Canal.

A 1886 study wrote of Abbas that he "undertook no great works, built no new canals, and did not even carry out the schemes and plans of his predecessors. Abbas has been called a bigot and a miser. He certainly was neither liberal in mind nor lavish with money."

Foreign relations
Abbas was inaccessible to adventurers bent on plundering Egypt and Sudan of riches, and kicked out all foreign business. However, at the insistence of the British Government, he allowed the construction of a railway from Alexandria to Cairo. In return, the British assisted him in a dispute with the Ottoman Empire. 

Due to his negative policies towards Europeans and their influence, Abbas was not liked by them and in time his reputation was exaggerated and demonized to portray him as worse than he actually was. After he died the number of Europeans in Egypt rose drastically from 3,000, in 1850, to 90,000, in 1882, and 200,000 by 1900.

Crimean War
During the Crimean War Abbas gave the Ottoman sultan, Abdulmejid I, use of his naval fleet of 12 warships as well as 19,000 troops and 72 guns. The number of troops was later increased to 40,000.

Horse breeding
Among Abbas' personal interests was the breeding of Arabian horses, which was said to be the overriding passion of his life.  He continued a breeding program begun by Muhammad Ali.  His development and acquisition of quality bloodlines had an immense influence on modern horse breeding.  Muhammad Ali and Abbas both recognized the unique characteristics and paid careful attention to bloodlines of the horses bred by the Bedouin tribes.  At age 23, Abbas had been put in charge of the horse breeding program of his grandfather.   Upon becoming Wali, Abbas accumulated additional horses and carefully documented the histories of the animals and their bloodlines, records which have been preserved into the present day.   Through a connection with Faisal Ibn Saud, for whom Abbas was said to have engineered an escape from a prison where he had been held, Abbas obtained a number of horses from the Nejd. He also paid very high prices for mares of the best bloodlines from the Anazeh people. He built extensive stables for these horses in three different locations, including a stud farm said to have cost £1,000,000 to build, and hired native Bedouins to oversee the care of the horses and to maintain information on their bloodlines.  He spared no expense in the care of his horses. At one stud farm he kept 300 camels to provide extra milk for the young foals.

Death
On 13 July 1854,  Abbas was murdered in the Benha Palace by two of his slaves. It was said that his cruelty to his servants was a motive for the murder.  For example, Arabian horse breeder Lady Anne Blunt was told that Abbas had once ordered a hot horseshoe to be nailed to the foot of a horse groom who had neglected the care of a horse's hooves.  

Abbas was succeeded by his uncle (who was actually younger than him), Said Pasha.

Following Abbas' assassination, his Arabian horses were inherited by his eighteen-year-old son,  Damad Prince Ibrahim Ilhamy Pasha who showed little interest in them, giving away several and putting the rest up for auction. In 1861, a distant relative, Ali Pasha Sherif purchased approximately 40 horses of the original Abbas Pasha stock and rebuilt the horse breeding program.

Honours

Footnotes

References

External links

1812 births
1854 deaths
19th-century Egyptian monarchs
Muhammad Ali dynasty
Ottoman governors of Egypt
Field marshals of the Ottoman Empire
Field marshals of Egypt
Knights Grand Cross of the Order of Saints Maurice and Lazarus
People murdered in Egypt
Arabian breeders and trainers
Slave owners